Nowmandan (also Romanized as Nowmandān; also known as Namandan) is a village in Lisar Rural District, Kargan Rud District, Talesh County, Gilan Province, Iran. According to the 2006 census, its population was 362, in 85 families.

References 

Populated places in Talesh County